Rajendra Singh was an Indian politician from Uttarakhand and three term Member of the Uttar Pradesh Legislative Assembly (1991 - 2000) and Interim Uttarakhand Assembly (2000 - 2002) from Mussoorie assembly constituency. He was a member of the Bharatiya Janata Party. He served as Deputy Minister in Kalyan Singh Cabinet.

Elections contested

References

1951 births
Members of the Uttarakhand Legislative Assembly
Uttar Pradesh MLAs 1991–1993
Uttar Pradesh MLAs 1993–1996
Uttar Pradesh MLAs 1997–2002
Bharatiya Janata Party politicians from Uttarakhand
Living people
Bharatiya Janata Party politicians from Uttar Pradesh